Complete Charlie Parker on Dial is a 1996 box set release of jazz saxophonist and composer Charlie Parker's 1946–47 recordings for Dial Records. The box set, released by Jazz Classics, features 89 songs, including alternate takes and notes composed by jazz historian and Parker biographer Ira Gitler. John Genarri, author of the book Blowin' Hot and Cool: Jazz and Its Critics singles out the recording of "Lover Man" on this album, noting that "[t]his wrenching, anguished version...has been called Parker's most poetic statement on record" though, says Gennari, Parker himself viewed it as substandard and threatened physical violence against Ross Russell, a Dial records producer, for including it. Gennari also indicates that other tracks included on this CD—"Relaxin' at Camarillo", "Cheers", "Stupendous" and "Carvin' the Bird"—"have struck many listeners as his most joyous and optimistic."

Recording history
Recording during Parker's tenure with Dial Records between Mar 28, 1946 and Dec 17, 1947, these 89 songs have been released multiple times. Spotlite Records in Britain released them in a series of vinyl volumes entitled Charlie Parker on Dial in the 1970s and re-released them on CD in a box set in 1993. They were released in a box set in 2004 by Stash Records. This 1996 box set groups takes and sessions together to allow listeners to closely compare the progression of the material as Parker and his fellow musicians developed it, with jazz improvisation morphing covered material as well as Parker's own compositions into different songs.

Track listing
Except where otherwise noted, all songs composed by Charlie Parker.

Disc 1
"Diggin' Diz" (George Handy) – 2:53
"Moose the Mooche" (Take 1) – 2:59
"Moose the Mooche" (Take) – 3:04
"Moose the Mooche" (Take 2) – 3:04
"Yardbird Suite" (Take 1) – 2:41
"Yardbird Suite" (Take 4, Master) – 2:56
"Ornithology" (Take 1) (Benny Harris, Parker) – 3:03
"Ornithology" (a.k.a. "Bird Lore") (Take 3) (Harris, Parker) – 3:19
"Ornithology" (Take 4, Master) (Harris, Parker) – 3:01
"A Night in Tunisia" (a.k.a. "the Famous Alto Break") (take 1) (Dizzy Gillespie, Frank Paparelli) – :51
"A Night in Tunisia" (Take 4) (Gillespie, Paparelli) – 3:08
"A Night in Tunisia" (Take 5, Master) (Gillespie, Paparelli) – 3:04
"Max (Is) Making Wax" (Take A, Master) (Oscar Pettiford) – 2:33
"Lover Man" (Take A, Master) (Jimmy David, Roger "Ram" Ramirez, Jimmy Sherman) – 3:22
"The Gypsy" (Take) (Billy Reid) – 3:05
"Rebop" (Take A, Master) (Gillespie) – 2:56
"Blues, No. 1" (Short) – :48
"Blues, No. 1" (Long) – 1:08
"Yardbird Suite" – 2:15
"Lullaby in Rhythm, Pt. 1" (Benny Goodman, Walter Hirsch, Clarence Profit, Edgar Sampson) – 1:33
"Lullaby in Rhythm, Pt. 2" (Goodman, Hirsch, Profit, Sampson) – 1:36
"Home Cooking, No. 1: Opus" (Hal McKusick) – 2:24
"Home Cooking, No. 2: Cherokee" (Ray Noble) – 2:09
"Home Cooking, No. 3: I Got Rhythm" (George Gershwin, Ira Gershwin) – 2:26

Disc 2
"This is Always" (Take C, Master) (Mack Gordon, Harry Warren) – 3:15
"This is Always" (Take D, Alternate) (Gordon, Warren) – 3:11
"Dark Shadows" (Take A, Alternate) (Shifty Henry) – 4:05
"Dark Shadows" (Take B, Alternate) (Henry) – 3:12
"Dark Shadows" (Take C, Master) (Henry) – 3:07
"Dark Shadows" (Take D, Alternate) (Henry) – 3:01
"Bird's Nest" (Take A, Master 1) – 2:53
"Bird's Nest" (Take B, Alternate) – 2:52
"Bird's Nest" (Take C, Master 2) – 2:44
"Cool Blues" (a.k.a. "Hot Blues") – 1:59
"Cool Blues" (a.k.a. "Blowtop Blues") – 2:25
"Cool Blues" (Take C, Master) – 3:09
"Cool Blues" (Take D, Alternate) – 2:53
"Relaxin' at Camarillo" (Take A) – 3:08
"Relaxin' at Camarillo" (Take C) – 3:07
"Relaxin' at Camarillo" (Take D) – 3:03
"Relaxin' at Camarillo" (Take E) – 2:59
"Cheers" (Take A) (Howard McGhee) – 3:11
"Cheers" (Take B) (McGhee) – 3:06
"Cheers" (Take C) (McGhee) – 3:03
"Cheers" (Take D) (McGhee) – 3:06
"Carvin' the Bird" (Take A, Alternate) (McGhee) – 2:46
"Carvin' the Bird" (Take B, Master) (McGhee) – 2:46
"Stupendous" (Take A, Master) (Melvin Broiles, McGhee) – 2:55
"Stupendous" (a.k.a. "Surprising") (Take B, Alternate) (Broiles, McGhee) – 2:53

Disc 3
"Dexterity" (Take A, Alternate) – 2:59
"Dexterity" (Take B, Master) – 3:00
"Bongo Bop" (a.k.a. "Blues") – 2:46
"Bongo Bop" (a.k.a. "Blues" and "Parker's Blues") – 2:46
"Dewey Square" (a.k.a. "Prezology/Bird Feathers") – 3:31
"Dewey Square" (Take B, Alternate) – 3:04
"Dewey Square" (Take C, Master) – 3:09
"The Hymn" (Take A, Master) – 2:34
"The Hymn" (Take B, Alternate) – 2:30
"Bird of Paradise" (Take A) – 3:10
"Bird of Paradise" (Take B) – 3:12
"Bird of Paradise" (Take C) – 3:13
"Embraceable You" (Take A) (Gershwin, Gershwin) – 3:49
"Embraceable You" (Take B) (Gershwin, Gershwin) – 3:25
"Bird Feathers" (a.k.a. "Schnourphology") (Take C, Master) – 2:53
"Klact-Oveeseds-Tene" (Take A, Master) – 3:08
"Klact-Oveeseds-Tene" (Take B, Alternate) – 3:07
"Scrapple from the Apple" (Take B, Alternate) – 2:41
"Scrapple from the Apple" (a.k.a. "Little Be-Bop") (Take C, Master) – 2:57

Disc 4
"My Old Flame" (Take A, Master) (Sam Coslow, Arthur Johnston) – 3:15
"Out of Nowhere" (Take A) (Johnny Green, Edward Heyman) – 4:06
"Out of Nowhere" (Take B) (Green, Heyman) – 3:52
"Out of Nowhere" (Take C) (Green, Heyman) – 3:08
"Don't Blame Me" (Take A, Master) (Dorothy Fields, Jimmy McHugh) – 2:49
"Drifting on a Reed" (Take B, Alternate) – 2:58
"Drifting on a Reed" (Take D, Alternate) – 2:55
"Drifting on a Reed" (a.k.a. "Air Conditioning") (Take E, Master) – 2:54
"Quasimado (Quasimodo)" (Take A, Alternate) – 2:56
"Quasimado (Quasimodo)" (a.k.a. "Trade Winds") (Take B, Master) – 2:55
"Charlie's Wig" (a.k.a. "Bongo Bop") – 2:48
"Charlie's Wig" (a.k.a. "Drifting on a Road") – 2:48
"Charlie's Wig" (Take E, Master) – 2:44
"Bongo Beep" (a.k.a. "Dexterity") (Take B) – 2:59
"Bongo Beep" (a.k.a. "Bird Feathers" and "Charlie's Wig") (Take C) – 2:59
"Crazeology (Little Benny)" (Take A, Excerpt) (Little Benny Harris) – 1:03
"Crazeology (Little Benny)" (Take B, Excerpt) (Harris) – :35
"Crazeology (Little Benny)" (Take C) (Harris) – 2:59
"Crazeology (Little Benny)" (Take D, Master 2. Also issues as Move and Bird Feathers) (Harris) – 3:00
"How Deep is the Ocean?" (Take A, Master) (Irving Berlin) – 3:25
"How Deep is the Ocean?" (Take B, Alternate) (Berlin) – 3:25

Personnel

Performance
Melvin Broiles – trumpet
Jimmy Bunn – piano
Red Callender – bass
Earl Coleman – vocals
Miles Davis – trumpet
Arnold Fishkind – bass
Russ Freeman – piano
Erroll Garner – piano
Arv Garrison – guitar
Wardell Gray – sax (tenor)
J.J. Johnson – trombone
Duke Jordan – piano
Barney Kessel – guitar
Bob "Dingbod" Kesterson – bass
Don Lamond – drums
Dodo Marmarosa – piano
Howard McGhee – trumpet
Vic McMillan – bass
Charlie Parker – sax (alto)
Roy Porter – drums
Tommy Potter – bass
Jimmy Pratt – drums
Max Roach – drums
Shorty Rogers – trumpet
Lucky Thompson – sax (tenor)
Harold "Doc" West – drums

Production
Will Friedwald – reissue producer
Tony Williams – reissue producer, digital engineer
Ben Jordan – engineer
David J. Weiner – associate producer
Bernard Brightman – executive producer
Ira Gitler – historical research

References

External links
Sound samples, hosted with permission at MTV

Charlie Parker albums
1996 compilation albums
Albums produced by Bernard Brightman